Cities District is a select Scottish provincial amateur rugby union team that draws its players from Glasgow District and Edinburgh District. It is occasionally known as the Glasgow-Edinburgh District side.

Founded in 1893, the Cities District team - and its corresponding Provinces District team - was created, thus halving Scotland's representative rugby union area in two.

History

Formation

To include other players when selecting the international team, the Cities v Provinces District match was introduced by the Scottish Rugby Union in the 1893–94 season.

The match was first played on Saturday 23 December 1893. The Provinces District was deemed a 'Rest of Scotland' side; though the 'Rest of Scotland' term was fluid dependent on the opposition.

Partial list of games played against international opposition

Notable former players

Scotland Internationalists

References

Rugby clubs established in 1893
Scottish District sides